Crisel Consunji (Chinese:姬素·孔尚治, born August 31, 1984) is a Filipina-Hong Kong actress, singer, and educator. In 2019 she won Best New Performer and was nominated for Best Actress at the 38th Hong Kong Film Awards for her role in Still Human.

Biography 
Consunji was born and raised in the Philippines. She received a BA and an MA in political science from the Ateneo de Manila University. She was trained at Repertory Philippines, a theatre company.

She moved to Hong Kong in 2008 to work at Hong Kong Disneyland, where she performed for three years as the lead vocalist in productions such as High School Musical and The Golden Mickeys. In 2015, she and her husband Carsten Rakutt founded Baumhaus, which provides creative arts classes to 0–6 years olds.

Acting career 
In 2017, she appeared in an episode of RTHK's series Below the Lion Rock. She auditioned for Still Human after clicking on a casting ad on Facebook. For her debut starring role, she became the first Filipino to be nominated for and to win Best New Performer, and the first to be nominated for Best Actress at the Hong Kong Film Awards. She delivered her speech in Cantonese, English, and Tagalog.

Filmography

Film

Television series

Awards and nominations

References

External links

 Official website

1984 births
Living people
21st-century Filipino actresses
Filipino film actresses
Hong Kong people of Filipino descent
Ateneo de Manila University alumni